The Sikkim Legislative Assembly election, 2004 took place on 10 May 2004 for 32 members of the Sikkim Legislative Assembly. Counting and result were declared on 13 May 2004. Sikkim Democratic Front, a regional political party, won 31 of the 32 assembly seats in this election.

Political parties
National parties
 BJP Bharatiya Janata Party
 CPM Communist Party of India (Marxist)
 INC Indian National Congress

State parties
 SDF Sikkim Democratic Front

Registered (unrecognised) parties
 SHRP Sikkim Himali Rajya Parishad
 SSP Sikkim Sangram Parishad

Results

Elected members

References

2004 State Assembly elections in India
State Assembly elections in Sikkim
2000s in Sikkim